Zinc finger protein 161 homolog is a protein that in humans is encoded by the ZFP161 gene.

See also 
 Chromosome 18 (human)
 Sequence homology
 Zinc finger

References

Further reading